Silabkhor, also rendered as Seilabkhor or Seylabkhvor , may refer to:
 Silabkhor-e Bala
 Silabkhor-e Pain